Jérôme Rota (Saint-Jean-de-Védas, 1973) is a French software developer. He is also known by the name Gej.

In 1999, while he was working as a graphic designer and a technical director in an advertising agency in France, he made the  "DivX ;-)" 3.11 Alpha video codec (the smiley was a part of the name) by hacking the Microsoft MPEG-4v3 codec (which was actually not MPEG-4 compliant) from Windows Media Tools 4 codecs. His hack had the advantage of supporting the AVI formatted files. Initial peer-to-peer rapid spread of the program turned into its introductions to the markets. As a result, a company was established.

The new project was first given the name ProjectMayo, and an open-source MPEG-4 codec called OpenDivX was made. It was later changed into a proprietary, closed-source product and the name was changed to DivX (dropping the smiley from the original MSMPEG-4 hack). Rota joined the company DivX, Inc. (formerly known as DivXNetworks, Inc.), based in San Diego, in 2000.  The company employed up to 300 employees by February 2007.

References

1973 births
Living people